Channa burmanica is a species of snakehead which is endemic to northern Burma. It is a very small species of snakehead included in the informal group of dwarf snakeheads. Its colouring closely resembles that of Channa gachua and Channa bleheri. It is very rarely found in pet shops. It is also considered to be a mouthbrooder species, though no successful breeding has yet occurred.

References

External links

 snakeheads.org the comprehensive website for all aspects of snakeheads

burmanica
Fish described in 1919